The 2019 Norwegian Football Cup was the 114th season of the Norwegian annual knock-out football tournament. It began with qualification matches in March and April 2019. The first round was played on 1 May 2019 and the tournament concluded with the final on 8 December 2019.

Viking won their sixth Cup title and qualified for the Europa League second qualifying round.

Calendar
Below are the dates for each round as given by the official schedule:

Source:

First round

Second round

Third round

Fourth round

Quarter-finals

Semi-finals

Final

Scorers

7 goals:

 Martin Samuelsen - Haugesund

6 goals:

 Tobias Lauritsen - Odd

5 goals:

 Oscar Aga - Stabæk

4 goals:

 Omar Fonstad el Ghaouti - Bryne

3 goals:

 Niklas Castro - Aalesund
 Julius Skaug - Asker
 Brage Berg Pedersen - Alta
 Henrik Kjelsrud Johansen - Brann
 Amadou Konaté - Bodø/Glimt
 Vetle Myhre - Bryne
 Mame Mor Ndiaye - Fram
 Tim André Nilsen - Fredrikstad
 Moses Mawa - KFUM Oslo
 Adem Güven - Kongsvinger
 Daniel Gustavsson - Lillestrøm
 Fredrik Brustad - Mjøndalen
 Sondre Johansen - Mjøndalen
 Eirik Ulland Andersen - Molde
 Leke James - Molde
 Marcus Mehnert - Nest-Sotra
 Filip Delaveris - Odd
 Granit Shala - Pors
 Mads Reginiussen - Ranheim
 Kent Håvard Eriksen - Sandnes Ulf
 Håvard Segtnan Thun - Strømmen
 Sander Finjord Ringberg - Tromsdalen
 Oliver Kjærgaard - Tromsø
 Finn Badou Jor - Ullern
 Bård Finne - Vålerenga
 Kristian Thorstvedt - Viking
 Zlatko Tripić - Viking

2 goals:

 Torbjørn Agdestein - Aalesund
 Hólmbert Friðjónsson - Aalesund
 Henrik Udahl - Åsane
 Jens Petter Hauge - Bodø/Glimt
 Andreas Mjøs - Brann
 Sondre Sandnes Beite - Brattvåg
 Erik Rosland - Bryne
 Daniel Berg - Bærum
 Erik Nordengen - Elverum
 Moses Dyer - Florø
 Andreas Hagen - Fredrikstad
 Erik Huseklepp - Fyllingsdalen
 Oliver Edvardsen - Grorud
 Torbjørn Kallevåg - Haugesund
 Ibrahima Koné - Haugesund
 Kevin Martin Krygård - Haugesund
 Niklas Sandberg - Haugesund
 Kristoffer Velde - Haugesund
 Walid Idrissi - Kjelsås
 Fisnik Kastrati - KFUM Oslo
 Stian Sortevik - KFUM Oslo
 David Tavakoli - Skeid/KFUM Oslo
 Bendik Bye - Kristiansund
 Peder Nomell - Kvik Halden
 Øystein Lundblad Næsheim - Kvik Halden
 Granit Buzuku - Levanger
 Didrik Ziabi Sereba - Levanger
 Vegard Voll - Levanger
 Thomas Lehne Olsen - Lillestrøm
 Riki Alba - Lørenskog
 Stian Aasmundsen - Mjøndalen
 Jakob Nyland Ørsahl - Molde
 Shadi Ali - Moss
 Tim André Reinback - Moss
 Alexander Dang - Nest-Sotra
 Mads Berg Sande - Nest-Sotra
 Torgeir Børven - Odd
 Vebjørn Hoff - Odd
 Kristian Bjørseth - Oppsal
 Magnus Blakstad - Ranheim
 Ola Solbakken - Ranheim
 Ivar Sollie Rønning - Ranheim
 Erik Botheim - Rosenborg
 Mohamed Ofkir - Sandefjord
 Lars-Jørgen Salvesen - Sarpsborg 08
 Ayoub Aleesami - Skeid
 Johnny Buduson - Skeid
 David Hickson - Skeid
 Joachim Soltvedt - Sogndal
 Ole Amund Sveen - Sogndal
 Franck Boli - Stabæk
 Raymond Gyasi - Stabæk
 Martin Rønning Ovenstad - Strømsgodset
 Sebastian Pedersen - Strømsgodset
 Amahl Pellegrino - Strømsgodset
 Gard Ragnar Killingberg - Tiller
 Lars Henrik Andreassen - Tromsdalen
 Brayan Rojas - Tromsø
 Fitim Azemi - Vålerenga
 Matthías Vilhjálmsson - Vålerenga
 Zymer Bytyqi - Viking
 Samúel Friðjónsson - Viking
 Tommy Høiland - Viking
 Ylldren Ibrahimaj - Viking

1 goal:

 Sondre Brunstad Fet - Aalesund
 Ståle Steen Sæthre - Aalesund
 Aron Elís Þrándarson - Aalesund
 Dag Andreas Ytrehauge Balto - Alta
 Håvard Nome - Alta
 Christian Reginiussen - Alta
 Kyle Spence - Alta
 Ulrik Berglann - Arendal
 Andreas Bruhn Christensen - Arendal
 Kim Kvaalen - Arendal
 Martin Mjelde Tysse - Arna-Bjørnar
 Eivind Fallås Dahl - Asker
 Aaron Lee Jones - Asker
 Magnus Bruun-Hansen - Åsane
 Simen Hopsdal - Åsane
 Andreas Andersen - Åssiden
 Steffen Egesund - Bergen Nord
 José Isidoro - Bodø/Glimt
 Oliver Sigurjónsson - Bodø/Glimt
 Ask Tjærandsen-Skau - Bodø/Glimt
 Thomas Grøgaard - Brann
 Amer Ordagic - Brann
 Azar Karadas - Brann
 Petter Strand - Brann
 Alexander Jonassen - Brattvåg
 Håkon Bjørdal Leine - Brattvåg
 Niklas Rekdal - Brattvåg
 Rógvi Baldvinsson - Bryne
 Bjarne Langeland - Bryne
 Chimaobi Ifejilika - Bærum
 Lars Ivar Slemdal - Bærum
 Kristoffer Sørensen - Bærum
 Morten Bjørlo - Egersund
 Kevin Jablinski - Egersund
 Markus Naglestad - Egersund
 Bob Sumareh - Egersund
 Runar Flugheim Heggestad - Eidsvold Turn
 Ingólfur Örn Kristjánsson - Eidsvold Turn
 Sondre Rustad Rudi - Eidsvold Turn
 Magnus Solum - Elverum
 Martin Hummervoll - Fana
 Lars Christian Moldestad - Fana
 Karsten Ellema Bjelde - Florø
 Malvin Gjerde - Florø
 Martin Indal Andersen - Fløy
 Dardan Dreshaj - Fløy
 Birk Berg-Johansen - Fløya
 Peder Waldemar Mæhle - Fløya
 Dan-Roger Roland - Fløya
 Jonas Simonsen - Fløya
 Islam Amir Darlishta - Follo
 Henrik Byklum - Fram
 Sindre Osestad - Fram
 Herman Solberg Olsen - Fram
 Ludvig Begby - Fredrikstad
 Maikel - Fredrikstad
 Nicolay Sandberg - Fredrikstad
 Marius Skutle - Frøya
 Morten Karlson - Frøyland
 Ivar Mykkeltvedt - Fyllingsdalen
 William Lloyd - Gjelleråsen
 Per Kristian Jansen - Gjøvik-Lyn
 Ole Thomas Skogli - Gjøvik-Lyn
 Anas Farah Ali - Grorud
 Thomas Elsebutangen - Grorud
 Elias Kristoffersen Hagen - Grorud
 Kevin Mankowitz - Grorud
 Preben Mankowitz - Grorud
 Jonas Enkerud - HamKam
 Sebastian Andreassen - Harstad
 Emil Galschiødt Kajander - Harstad
 Marchus Strømøy Kajander - Harstad
 Jonathan Damilola Olaoye - Harstad
 Jakob Klæboe Pedersen - Harstad
 Thore Pedersen - Haugesund
 Sondre Tronstad - Haugesund
 Anders Langåker Underhaug - Haugesund
 Ibrahima Wadji - Haugesund
 Ola Scheele Moe - Heming
 Alf Jakob Aano - Hinna
 Cairo Ico Nascimento Lima - Hinna
 Makhtar Thioune - Hinna
 Håkon Botn Brautaset - Hødd
 Bendik Rise - Hødd
 Robin Shroot - Hødd
 Preben Alexander Sætre - Hødd
 Daniel Aase - Jerv
 Martin Hoel Andersen - Jerv
 Ole Marius Håbestad - Jerv
 Abdul-Basit Agouda - KFUM Oslo
 Lars Olden Larsen - KFUM Oslo
 Yannis Maxitas Moula - KFUM Oslo
 Emmanuel Troudart - KFUM Oslo
 Magnus Aasarød - Kjelsås
 Akinbola Akinyemi - Kjelsås
 Jesper Solli - Kjelsås
 Erik Rotlid - Kolstad
 Markus Aanesland - Kongsvinger
 Jonas Rønningen - Kongsvinger
 Martin Vinjor - Kongsvinger
 Aliou Coly - Kristiansund
 Liridon Kalludra - Kristiansund
 Flamur Kastrati - Kristiansund
 Meinhard Olsen - Kristiansund
 Sondre Sørli - Kristiansund
 Magnus Krogsrud - Kråkerøy
 Amani Dickson Mbedule - Kråkerøy
 Deni Hasanagic - Kvik Halden
 Dardan Mehmeti - Kvik Halden
 Andreas Hegdahl Gundersen - Levanger
 Ermal Hajdari - Levanger
 Ivo Öjhage - Levanger
 Sindre Sakshaug - Levanger
 Alex Dyer - Lillestrøm
 Daniel A. Pedersen - Lillestrøm
 Eskild Haugland Båsen - Lysekloster
 Damian Kamil Garbacik - Lysekloster
 Ole-Marius Forsberg - Lørenskog
 Michael Singh - Lørenskog
 Karl-Christian Karlsen - Melbo
 Adrian Pedersen - Melbo
 Jibril Bojang - Mjøndalen
 Sondre Liseth - Mjøndalen
 Olivier Occéan - Mjøndalen
 Christoffer Remmer - Molde
 Alagie Sanyang - Moss
 Remi André Svindland - Moss
 Christoffer Engan - Nardo
 Jonas Tømmerdal Frøner - Nardo
 Daniel Arrocha - Nest-Sotra
 Peter Sørensen Nergaard - Nest-Sotra
 Thor Kristian Økland - Nest-Sotra
 Tom Kristian Stavseth - Norild
 Erlend Hustad - Notodden
 Abubakar Aliyu Ibrahim - Notodden
 Fabrizio Cardaccio Tambucho - Nybergsund
 Joshua Kitolano - Odd
 Espen Ruud - Odd
 Jone Samuelsen - Odd
 Sander Svendsen - Odd
 Sami Loulanti - Oppsal
 Simen Thorsen - Pors
 Torbjørn Lysaker Heggem - Ranheim
 Michael Karlsen - Ranheim
 Daniel Kvande - Ranheim
 Olaus Skarsem - Ranheim
 Sondre Sørløkk - Ranheim
 Erik Tønne - Ranheim
 Glenn Walker - Ranheim
 Parfait Bizoza - Raufoss
 Ikhsan Fandi - Raufoss
 Anton Henningsson - Raufoss
 Mikkel Maigaard - Raufoss
 Matias Belli Moldskred - Raufoss
 Gard Simenstad - Raufoss
 Samuel Adegbenro - Rosenborg
 David Akintola - Rosenborg
 Anders Konradsen - Rosenborg
 Birger Meling - Rosenborg
 Tore Reginiussen - Rosenborg
 Gustav Valsvik - Rosenborg
 Gjermund Åsen - Rosenborg
 Olav Andre Fausa - Rørvik
 Lars Grorud - Sandefjord
 Viðar Ari Jónsson - Sandefjord
 Stefan Mladenovic - Sandefjord
 Bjørnar Holmvik - Sandnes Ulf
 Sanel Kapidzic - Sandnes Ulf
 Jørgen Strand Larsen - Sarpsborg 08
 Steffen Lie Skålevik - Sarpsborg 08
 Alexander Ruud Tveter - Sarpsborg 08
 Ahmed El-Amrani - Skeid
 Mathias Dahl Abelsen - Skeid
 Muhammed Adams - Skeid
 Sander Flåte - Skeid
 Johannes Nunez Godoy - Skeid
 Saeed Ahmad Rahim - Skjetten
 Lars Rydje - Skjetten
 Ulrik Flo - Sogndal
 Sigurd Haugen - Sogndal
 Sixten Jensen - Sogndal
 Per Magnus Steiring - Sogndal
 Frederic Falck - Sotra
 Kjetil Kalve - Sotra
 Lars Kilen - Sotra
 Jone Rugland - Sotra
 Kristoffer Stava - Sotra
 Sigurd Tafjord - Spjelkavik
 Marius Myking Waagan - Spjelkavik
 Daniel Braaten - Stabæk
 Herman Geelmuyden - Stabæk
 Raymond Gyasi - Stabæk
 Luc Kassi - Stabæk
 Youness Mokhtar - Stabæk
 Hugo Vetlesen - Stabæk
 Madis Vihmann - Stabæk
 Mats Lillebo - Stjørdals-Blink
 Ola Rygg - Stjørdals-Blink
 Nedzad Sisic - Stjørdals-Blink
 Sivert Solli - Stjørdals-Blink
 Martin Hagen - Storm
 Thomas Pedersen - Storm
 Sivert Stenseth Gussiås - Strømmen
 Øystein Vestvatn - Strømmen
 Mounir Hamoud - Strømsgodset
 Mos - Strømsgodset
 Stian Ringstad - Strømsgodset
 Tor Erik Torske - Sunndal
 Sindre Myrvold Welo - Tiller
 Petter Senstad - Toten
 Kodjo Somesi - Toten
 Thomas Kind Bendiksen - Tromsdalen
 Håkon Kjæve - Tromsdalen
 Tomas Kritoffersen - Tromsdalen
 Robin Lorentzen - Tromsdalen
 Andreas Løvland - Tromsdalen
 Adrian Sandbukt - Tromsdalen
 Sigurd Grønli - Tromsø
 Mikael Ingebrigtsen - Tromsø
 August Mikkelsen - Tromsø
 Lasse Nilsen - Tromsø
 Eirik Saur Holte - Trygg/Lade
 Eirik Wågan Selnes - Trygg/Lade
 Edvard Khachatrjan - Træff
 Stian Bjarnar Samdal - Træff
 Simen Varhaugvik - Træff
 Herman Henriksen - Ullensaker/Kisa
 Eric Kitolano - Ullensaker/Kisa
 Ole Kristian Langås - Ullensaker/Kisa
 Ole Andreas Nesset - Ullensaker/Kisa
 Sverre Økland - Ullensaker/Kisa
 Martin Søreide - Ullensaker/Kisa
 Martin Torp - Ullensaker/Kisa
 Lars Austnes - Ullern
 Eivind Stender - Ullern
 Deyver Vega - Vålerenga
 Stian Barane - Vard Haugesund
 Aleksander Gundersen - Vard Haugesund
 Erik Skeie - Verdal
 Steffen Klemetsen Jakobsen - Vidar
 Johnny Furdal - Viking
 Benjamin Källman - Viking
 Even Østensen - Viking
 Fredrik Torsteinbø - Viking
 Rolf Daniel Vikstøl - Viking

Own goals:
 Glenn Mjelde Håberg - Kjelsås (22 May 2019 vs Skeid)
 Andreas Slungård Rushfeldt - Norild (1 May 2019 vs Tromsø)
 Stefan Antonijevic - Sogndal (19 June 2019 vs Brann)
 Mounir Hamoud - Strømsgodset (19 June 2019 vs Fram)
 Adrian Reinholt Jensen - Åga (1 May 2019 vs Bodø/Glimt)
 Benjamin Fabian Stokholm Ravndal - Ålgård (1 May 2019 vs Bryne)

References

 
Norwegian Football Cup seasons
Cup
Norway